Mario Radić (born 14 January 1982) is a former professional tennis player from Croatia.

Biography
Radić' was born in the Croatian city of Split and developed his tennis under the tutelage of famed coach Pato Álvarez in Barcelona, Spain. He later moved to the Veneto region of Italy where he remained based. He was a member of the Croatian team that were runners-up to Spain in the 1998 Junior Davis Cup. 

Turning professional in 2000, Radić competed mostly on the Challenger circuit, with the occasional main draw appearance on the ATP Tour. His highest ranking, 141 in the world, was attained in 2002. At a Challenger tournament in Texas in 2002 he had a win over Michael Chang. He twice made the second round of the ATP Tour tournament in Umag, in both 2002 and 2003. In 2003 he also defeated František Čermák to win the Banja Luka Challenger and in the same year won the doubles event at the Brindisi Challenger, with Iván Navarro. He was a member of the Croatian Davis Cup squad for their 2003 World Group quarter-final.

He lives with his wife and children in Spinea, Italy.

Challenger titles

Singles: (1)

Doubles: (1)

References

External links
 
 

1982 births
Living people
Croatian male tennis players
Tennis players from Split, Croatia
Sportspeople from the Metropolitan City of Venice
Croatian emigrants to Italy